Hohenbergia stellata is a perennial species of the genus Hohenbergia. It is native to Trinidad and Tobago, Martinique, Netherlands Antilles, Venezuela, and northeastern Brazil (Alagoas, Bahia, Piauí etc.).

Hohenbergia stellata exhibits sharp spines in its inflorescence. Flowers are purple-red and are present along the plant's strong stem, which grows up to 100 cm tall. In Brazil this plant forms a microhabitat of the tarantula Pachistopelma bromelicola.

Taxonomic status
Some research suggests that the Hohenbergia stellata may actually be more closely related to members of the genus Aechmea than to other species of Hohenbergia.

Photo gallery

References

External links
Dave's Garden plant files, Hohenbergia stellata
e-monocot, Hohenbergia stellata Schult. & Schult.f., distribution map

stellata
Flora of the Dutch Caribbean
Flora of the Netherlands Antilles
Flora of Brazil
Flora of Martinique
Flora of Trinidad and Tobago
Flora of Venezuela
Plants described in 1830
Flora without expected TNC conservation status